Marilyn Chagoya  (born July 22, 1994) is a Mexican beauty pageant titleholder who won the title of "Nuestra Belleza Mundo México" at the Nuestra Belleza México 2012 pageant.

Chagoya was chosen to represent her country in Miss World 2013 during the 2012 first edition of Nuestra Belleza Mundo México, held August 30, 2012 in Tuxtla Gutiérrez, Chiapas. Chagoya was crowned Nuestra Belleza Mundo México by the outgoing titleholder Mariana Berumen.

References

External links

1994 births
Living people
People from Poza Rica
Nuestra Belleza México winners
Miss World 2013 delegates